Pseudozygocera albomaculata is a species of beetle in the family Cerambycidae, and the only species in the genus Pseudozygocera. It was described by Stephan von Breuning in 1948.

References

Beetles described in 1948